Shi Yiyi (born 1 November 2001) is a Chinese footballer currently playing as a midfielder for Chinese club a Ji'nan Xingzhou.

Club career
Shi made his debut with Qingdao Jonoon in the 2020 China League Two season.

Career statistics

Club
.

Notes

References

2001 births
Living people
Footballers from Chongqing
Chinese footballers
China youth international footballers
Association football midfielders
China League Two players
Shanghai Shenxin F.C. players
Shenzhen F.C. players